Dungeon Hero was to have been a role-playing video game developed by Firefly Studios and published by Gamecock Media Group. It had been in development for several years and had been scheduled to be released in 2009 for Microsoft Windows and Xbox 360. Originally being published by Gamecock Media Group until they were bought out by SouthPeak Games in October 2008, it is currently without a publisher  despite Southpeak publishing every other Gamecock title due for release. Firefly Studios has announced that the title is 'on hold', and with the last of several planned release dates having passed, it has further fuelled speculation that this title is now a vaporware title.

Gameplay
Dungeon Hero featured strategic hack-and-slash  gameplay with role-playing game (RPG) elements. The game took place in a retro-modern world during a massive war. Most of the game took place above ground fighting for the goblin cause. The beginning of the game was placed in one of the goblin's fortified locations, or dungeon, where a goblin hospital has been set up. The task of the player was to help the goblins win their war in exchange for your freedom.

Plot
The player is a Mercenary and has come across a goblin city, looking for treasure. However, the goblin city is under attack and the goblins hire the mercenary to help them. As the mercenary, you must help the goblins defend their home from hordes of enemies.

References

External links
Dungeon Hero Preview - EuroGamer

Cancelled Windows games
Cancelled Xbox 360 games
Role-playing video games
Vaporware video games
Video games developed in the United Kingdom